Percy Gets a Job is a 1912 Australian comedy short film starring W. S. Percy, "Australia's greatest comedian". It was one of the first Australian comedy short films. It was also known as Percy at the Lawyers and was released with another local short, Toggle Won't Go to School.

Percy's First Holiday

W.S. Percy later made another, more widely known short, Percy's First Holiday.

Plot
Percy travels from Sydney to New York. He is thrown out of a cinema; fights a 16 stone actor for the privilege of playing the part of an attractive young lady's younger brother; treats a young girl to a plate of spaghetti in a tango restaurant; argues with her infuriated husband; is fleeced of every penny by race course crooks and has to work his way home as a steward. At the end he leans over the side of the vessel and says "I'm just crazy about America, but oh! I love Australia!"

Production
Percy had left Australia for the US at the end of 1913. In February 1914 he arrived in New York and met Millard Johnson, the local representative of Union Theatres, who suggested he visit the Thanhouser Film Company Studio. They suggested Percy star in a comedy for the studio, and a scenario was written in 20 minutes.

While in New York, Percy also appeared in the Broadway show Maid of Athens.

Release
The movie was supposedly only made for Australian consumption but ended up being released around the world. It was highly popular in Australia.

References

External links

1912 films
Australian silent films
1912 comedy films
Australian black-and-white films
Australian comedy films